Dheepan Chakkravarthy is an Indian playback singer. He is the son of the first playback singer in the Tamil film industry, "Isai Thendral" Thiruchi Loganathan and grandson of actress C. T. Rajakantham.

Filmography
Rani Theni (1982)
Veeramum Eeramum (2007)
Arasangam (2008)
Vaamanan (2009)

Discography

References

Indian male playback singers
Tamil playback singers
Indian male film actors
Indian male television actors
Living people
21st-century Indian actors
1956 births